The consort (or spouse) of the royal rulers of Lithuania and of the Polish–Lithuanian Commonwealth was in all cases a woman and nearly all took the title of Grand Duchess.

Queen consort of Lithuania 

Morta and her sister were the only Queens of Lithuania; her successors took the title of "Grand Duchess" instead.

The short-lived Kingdom of Lithuania of 1918 had a King-Elect Mindaugas II of Lithuania: but his first wife, Duchess Amalie in Bavaria, had died six years earlier, and his second marriage, to Princess Wiltrud of Bavaria, occurred six years after the Kingdom was replaced by a Republic.

Grand Duchess of Lithuania

Mindaugas Dynasty

Gediminid Dynasty

Royal consort of the Polish–Lithuanian Commonwealth

Notes

Sources
LITHUANIA

 
Consorts
Lithuanian, consorts
Lithuanian, consorts
Lithuania, List of royal consorts of